Tucker High School is the only public high school in Tucker, a city in DeKalb County, Georgia, 
United States. It is operated by the DeKalb County School District. Its student body consists of over 1,800 students from many different cultures.

Academics
On December 17, 2012, the Southern Association of Colleges and Schools announced that it had downgraded the DeKalb County School District's status from "on advisement" to "on probation" and warned the school system that the loss of their accreditation was "imminent." AdvancED/SACS upgraded the district's status to "Accredited Advisement" in February 2015.

Notable alumni

 Asher Allen - former professional football player
 A. J. Bouye - professional football player, Carolina Panthers
 Marshon Brooks - professional basketball player
 Thomas Brown - former professional football player
 Clay Cook - singer-songwriter and Zac Brown Band guitarist 
 Dwayne Harris - former professional football player
 Keri Hilson - R&B singer-songwriter  
 Buckshot Jones - NASCAR driver 
 Matthew Perryman Jones - performing songwriter 
 Seantavius Jones - former professional football player 
 Jonathan Ledbetter - professional football player, Arizona Cardinals
 Brandon Lang - former professional football player
 Brendan O'Brien - music producer and musician 
 JaQuel Knight - choreographer and dancer
 John McMakin - former professional football player
 John Oxendine - former Insurance Commissioner and 2010 candidate for governor 
 Patrick Pass - former professional football player 
 Mark B. Perry - Emmy winning television producer and writer: Wonder Years, Law & Order, Party of Five, etc
 Dwight Phillips - Olympic gold medalist 
 Duke Shelley - professional football player, Chicago Bears
 Jamoris Slaughter - former professional football player
 Andy Stanley - pastor, author, and founder of North Point Ministries 
 Neiko Thorpe - former professional football player
 James Vaughters - professional football player, Atlanta Falcons

References

External links
 Tucker High School

1918 establishments in Georgia (U.S. state)
Educational institutions established in 1918
DeKalb County School District high schools
Tucker, Georgia